Roger I (– 22 June 1101), nicknamed Roger Bosso and The Great, was a Norman nobleman who became the first Count of Sicily from 1071 to 1101. He was a member of the House of Hauteville, and his descendants in the male line continued to rule Sicily down to 1194.

Roger was born in Normandy, and came to southern Italy as a young man in 1057. He participated in several military expeditions against the Emirate of Sicily beginning in 1061. He was invested with part of Sicily and the title of count by his brother, Robert Guiscard, Duke of Apulia, in 1071. By 1090, he had conquered the entire island. In 1091, he conquered Malta. The state he created was merged with the Duchy of Apulia in 1127 and became the Kingdom of Sicily in 1130.

Conquest of Calabria and Sicily
Roger was the youngest son of Tancred of Hauteville by his second wife Fredisenda. Roger arrived in Southern Italy in the summer of 1057. The Benedictine monk, Goffredo Malaterra, who compares Robert Guiscard and his brother Roger to "Joseph and Benjamin of old," said of Roger: 

In 1057 he shared the conquest of nearly all of Calabria excepting Reggio with his brother Robert. For a time Roger lived like a bandit in his castle of Scalea, near Cosenza.  In a treaty of 1062, the brothers divided the conquest so that each was to have half of every castle and town in Calabria. It was about this same time that Roger married Judith d'Évreux.

Roger had first thought of conquering Sicily when he and his brother conquered Calabria. At the time, it was ruled by Muslims and the population were mostly Byzantine Greek Christians. The Arab princes had become all but independent of the sultan of Tunis. In May 1061 the brothers crossed from Reggio and captured Messina. In June 1063, Roger defeated a Muslim army at the Battle of Cerami and would strike another victory at the Battle of Misilmeri in 1068. After they took Palermo in January 1072, Robert Guiscard, as suzerain, invested Roger as Count of Sicily. Robert retained Palermo, half of Messina, and the north-east portion (the Val Demone). Not till 1085 was Roger able to undertake a systematic conquest.

In March 1086 Syracuse surrendered, and when in February 1091 Noto yielded, the conquest of Sicily was complete. Much of Robert's success had been due to Roger's support. After Robert died and Count Roger became the senior member of the family, he supported his nephew, Duke Roger Borsa, against his other nephew, Prince Bohemund of Taranto, Lando IV of Capua, and other rebels. In return for his uncle's aid against Bohemund and the rebels, Duke Roger Borsa surrendered his share in the castles of Calabria to his Roger in 1085, and in 1091 his inheritance in Palermo, likewise.

Roger's rule in Sicily became more absolute than that of Robert Guiscard in Italy. In addition, due to immigration by Lombards and Normans, Latin Christianity gradually replaced that of the Greek Byzantine tradition. At the enfeoffments of 1072 and 1092, no great undivided fiefs were created. The mixed Norman, French and Italian vassals all owed their benefices to the count. No feudal revolt of importance arose against Roger.

Conquest of Malta

In 1091 Roger, in order to avoid an attack from North Africa, set sail with a fleet to conquer Malta. His ship reached the island before the rest. On landing, the few defenders the Normans encountered retreated and the following day Roger marched to the capital Mdina. Terms were discussed with the local qadi. It was agreed that the islands would become tributaries of the count himself and that the qadi should continue to administer the islands. With the treaty many Greek and other Christian prisoners were released, who chanted to Roger the Kyrie eleison. He left the islands with many who wished to join him and so many were on his ship that it nearly sank, according to Geoffrey Malaterra. The invasion was romanticized in later centuries, and legends arose that the Count gave the Maltese their red and white flag by cutting a part of his banner. Mass is said once a year in remembrance of the Count at the Cathedral of Mdina, as a recognition for the Count's role in liberating Maltese Christians from Muslim dominance and rule.

Rule of Sicily

Politically supreme, the count also became master of the insular church. The Papacy, favouring a prince who had recovered Sicily from Greeks and Muslims, in 1098 granted Roger and his heirs the Apostolic Legateship of the island. Roger created new Latin bishoprics at Syracuse, Girgenti and elsewhere, nominating the bishops personally, while he turned the archbishopric of Palermo into a Catholic see. Of these bishops and other important clergy positions, a minority were French, and of those even fewer were Norman. Of the five new sees he founded, one bishop was Norman and three others were from other parts of France. He practiced general toleration towards Arabs and Greeks, even sponsoring the construction of over twelve Greek monasteries in the Val Demone region. In the cities, the Muslims, who had generally secured such rights in their terms of surrender, retained their mosques, their qadis, and freedom of trade; in the country, however, they became serfs. Roger drew the mass of his infantry from the Muslims; Saint Anselm, visiting him at the siege of Capua, 1098, found "the brown tents of the Arabs innumerable". Nevertheless, the Latin element began to prevail, as Lombards and other Italians flocked to the island in the wake of the conquest, and the conquest of Sicily proved decisive in the steady decline of Muslim power in the western Mediterranean from this time.

Death and succession 
Roger I died on 22 of June 1101 in Mileto and was buried at the Benedictine Abbey of the Holy Trinity. The abbey was destroyed in the earthquake of 1783. Its ruins are currently located in the Mileto Antica archaeological park.

Upon Roger's death, his son, Simon of Hauteville, became the Count of Sicily, with his mother, Adelaide del Vasto, acting as his regent. On 28 September 1105, at the age of 12, Simon died, and the title of count passed to his younger brother, Roger II of Sicily, with Adelaide continuing on as regent, being the mother of Roger II as well.

Family

Roger's eldest son, Jordan, predeceased him. Roger's second son, Geoffrey, possibly illegitimate, was a leper with no chance of inheriting.

Roger's first marriage took place in 1062, to Judith d'Évreux. She died in 1076, leaving daughters:

 A daughter, married Hugh of Jarzé (died 1075/6), the first count of Paternò
 Matilda (1062 – before 1094), wife of Robert, Count of Eu and Raymond IV of Toulouse
 Adelisa (died 1096), married in 1083 to Henry, Count of Monte Sant'Angelo
 Emma (died 1120), briefly engaged to Philip I of France; married firstly William VI of Auvergne and secondly Rudolf of Montescaglioso.

In 1077, Roger married a second time, to Eremburga of Mortain, and their children were:
 Mauger, Count of Troina
 Matilda, wife of Ranulf II, Count of Alife
 Muriel (died 1119), married Josbert de Lucy
 Constance
 Felicia, wife of Coloman, King of Hungary
 Violante, married Robert, son of Robert I of Burgundy
 Flandina, married Henry del Vasto
 Judith (died 1136), married Robert I of Bassunvilla

Roger's last wife was Adelaide del Vasto, a sister of his son-in-law Henry del Vasto. They married in 1087. Roger and Adelaide's children were:
 Simon of Sicily
 Roger II of Sicily
 Maximilla (Matilda), wife of Conrad II of Italy

Roger's other daughter called Matilda married Guigues III, Count of Albon.

Ancestry

References

Sources

Further reading
Aubé, Pierre. Roger II de Sicile. Un Normand en Méditerranée. Payot, 2001.
 Alex Metcalfe. The Muslims of Medieval Italy. Edinburgh, 2009.
Norwich, John Julius. The Normans in the South 1016–1130. London: Longmans, 1967.

1030s births
1101 deaths
11th-century monarchs in Europe
Counts of Sicily
Italo-Normans
Norman warriors
Hauteville family
Norman conquest of southern Italy
Counts
Counts of Malta